Harthill Castle is a large 17th-century Z-plan castle, about  north-west of Inverurie, Aberdeenshire, Scotland, south of Kirkton of Oyne.

It may also be known as Torries Castle.

History
The Leiths held the property from 1531, and they probably built the castle: a date of 1601 or 1638 is disputed.  Patrick Leith served with James Graham, 1st Marquess of Montrose, but was captured and beheaded by John Middleton, 1st Earl of Middleton.  The last Leith of Harthill is believed to have set the castle on fire deliberately.  
The Erskines of Pittodrie acquired the property.

Having been reduced to a roofless shell it was restored in the 1970s and is still occupied; restoration was completed in 1978.

Structure
The castle has a main block comprising four storeys and a garret.  There are towers at opposite corners, a square and a round one.  The walls are pierced by gun loops, while there are bartizans at the corners.

Parts of a gatehouse and of a courtyard wall remain; they have been incorporated in a rebuilt wall.  The castle entrance is in the re-entrant angle.

There is a vaulted basement, which contained a guardroom.  A turnpike stair ascends from the basement of the square tower, but there were also stairs from the kitchen and the wine cellar to the hall on the first floor.  The round tower has a dome-vaulted cellar.
The hall, which was a fine chamber, had stone seats and a large fireplace.  Turnpike stairs in the thickness of the walls led to private chambers above and in the towers. 
 
There is a small wallhead walkway.

Castles in Great Britain and Ireland
List of castles in Scotland

References

Castles in Aberdeenshire